X Company is a Canadian/Hungarian spy thriller television series created by Flashpoint's Mark Ellis and Stephanie Morgenstern which premiered on February 18, 2015, on CBC Television. The series takes place during World War II, and follows five recruits as they are trained as agents at a secret Canadian training facility, Camp X near Lake Ontario east of Toronto and then sent out into the field in Europe. The final episode of the series aired on CBC on March 15, 2017.

X Company was produced by Temple Street and Pioneer Stillking Kft. Mark Ellis and Stephanie Morgenstern wrote some episodes and were also executive producers with Ivan Schneeberg, David Fortier, Kerry Appleyard (Temple Street) and Bill Haber (Ostar Productions). Directors included Grant Harvey, Amanda Tapping, Paolo Barzman, Julian Gilbey and Stephanie Morgenstern.

On March 4, 2015, CBC renewed the series for a second season with ten episodes, two more than the first season of eight. On March 31, 2016, CBC announced that the series would be renewed for a ten-episode third season, to début in the winter of 2017. On September 1, 2016, it was announced that this would be the final season for the show.

International distribution 
The series was shown in several countries, via distribution by Sony Pictures Television. Broadcasters that aired the series included TF1 in France, History in Latin America, History in the UK, Mystery in Japan, D-Smart in Turkey, 365 Media in Iceland, MBC in the Middle East, Mega in Greece and by Pickbox in Slovenia and Bosnia/Herzegovina. On April 2, 2017, the series was picked up by Ovation in the United States.

Cast 

Notes

Production 
X Company had been an idea being considered for over a dozen years by creators Mark Ellis and Stephanie Morgenstern. They made a short film entitled Remembrance which did well enough on the festival circuit to encourage them to develop a feature script which eventually became X Company. Originally titled Camp X, the series was filmed in Budapest, Hungary, from August to October 2014, and in Orlovat, Serbia and is a Canadian-Hungarian co-production. X Company is inspired by the real spy training facility, Camp X, which was located between Whitby and Oshawa, Ontario, Canada.

Season 2 filmed for four months in Budapest, and Esztergom, Hungary beginning in July 2015. Season 2 aired on January 27 on CBC.

Season 3, the final of the series, was also filmed in and around Budapest, Hungary; location work was completed in November 2016 and the premiere was on January 11, 2017.

Critical reception 
Writing in the Huffington Post, Denette Wilford said: "X Company is another history lesson CBC is offering audiences, and it nails it once again". The Globe and Mails TV critic John Doyle called it "vastly entertaining" and "a good solid thriller".

Episodes

Season 1 (2015)

Season 2 (2016)

Season 3 (2017)

References

External links 
 
 

2015 Canadian television series debuts
2017 Canadian television series endings
2010s Canadian drama television series
CBC Television original programming
World War II television drama series
Espionage television series
Television series based on actual events
Television series by Sony Pictures Television
Canadian thriller television series
Television series set in the 1940s
Spy thriller television series
Television series by Temple Street Productions